Raetihi Forest fire was a fire that occurred on the 19–20 March 1918 in and around the townships of Raetihi and Ohakune in the North Island of New Zealand.

The great fire itself was a major catastrophe. It burned for two days, devastating areas of forest and almost destroying the townships of Raetihi and Ohakune. In addition to the great stands of Rimu and other large stands of podocarps in the North Island Volcanic Plateau of New Zealand, 150 houses and nine sawmills were lost. Three people died as a result of the fire when their farmhouse burned.

It was generally thought but never confirmed that the forest was set alight by coals dropped from a railway engine on the newly developed North Island Main Trunk Railway.

See also
List of fires

References

History of Manawatū-Whanganui
1918 in New Zealand
Wildfires in New Zealand
1918 fires in Oceania
1918 disasters in New Zealand